Rosendo is a Spanish male given name. The name comes from St. Rudesind, San Rosendo, in Spanish (907–977) who was Bishop of Iria Flavia at the time of Rodrigo Velázquez. Places named after the saint include San Rosendo, a town in Chile.

The best-known individual with the name today is Rosendo Mercado, known simply as "Rosendo" in Spain, a Spanish singer.

Other notable people with the name include:
 Rosendo Salvado (1814–1900), Spanish bishop in Australia
 Rosendo Mercado, Spanish musician
 Rosendo Fernández (es), Spanish painter
 Rosendo Huguet Peralta (es), Spanish missionary and philosopher
 Rosendo Mendizábal (es), Argentine musician
 Rosendo Radilla (es), Mexican politician
 Rosendo Canto (es), Cuban essayist
 Rosendo Salazar (es), Mexican writer
 Rosendo López, after whom a barrio(es) in Bahía Blanca, Buenos Aires, Argentina is named
 Rosendo Hernández, after whom Autódromo Rosendo Hernández (es), Argentina is named

See also 
 Rosendo pascuali, a notohippid notoungulate named in 2018

Spanish masculine given names